Eremophila conferta is a flowering plant in the figwort family, Scrophulariaceae and is endemic to a small area in the central west of Western Australia. It is a shrub with many tangled branches with leaves crowded near their ends and with mauve or purple flowers.

Description
The branches are covered with a layer of long, branched hairs. The leaves are arranged alternately, densely crowded and are covered with soft grey hairs.

The petal tube is purple, blue or lilac-coloured and white inside, with faint purple spots and is mostly glabrous. The 4 stamens are fully enclosed in the petal tube.

Taxonomy and naming
Eremophila conferta was first formally described by Robert Chinnock in 2007 and the description was published in Eremophila and Allied Genera: A Monograph of the Plant Family Myoporaceae. The specific epithet (conferta) is a Latin word meaning "crowded" referring to the leaves of this species.

Distribution and habitat
This eremophila occurs between Kumarina and the Barlee Range in the Gascoyne biogeographic region where it grows in stony soils on plains, and stony ridges.

Conservation status
Eremophila conferta is classified as "not threatened" by the Government of Western Australia Department of Parks and Wildlife.

Use in horticulture
This eremophila features soft grey foliage and showy flowers but is frost sensitive and will not tolerate humidity. It has been propagated by grafting onto Myoporum and grown in well-drained soil in a sunny position.

References

conferta
Eudicots of Western Australia
Plants described in 2007
Endemic flora of Western Australia